Three Drives, also known as Three Drives on a Vinyl, are a Dutch progressive trance duo founded by Erik de Koning and Ton van Empel. In June 2014, van Empel left the group.

Career
Their best-known tracks are "Greece 2000" (originally released in 1997 by Massive Drive Recordings, with more mainstream releases on ZYX Music and Hooj Choons) and "Sunset on Ibiza".

Discography

Singles
Three Drives/Three Drives on a Vinyl
1997 Greece 2000 EP – UK No. 44
1998 "Greece 2000" (Remixes) – UK No. 12, AUS No. 81
1999 "EP 2000"
1999 "Turkey 2000"
1999 "Superfunk"
2000 "Sunset on Ibiza" – UK No. 44
2001 "Sunset on Ibiza" (Remixes)
2002 "Carrera 2" – UK No. 57
2003 "Greece 2000" (2003 Remixes)
2004 "Signs from the Universe"
2004 "Air Traffic" – UK No. 75
2005 "Evolution"
2005 "Greece 2000" (2005 Remixes)
2007 "Greece 2000" (2007 Remixes)
2008 "Greece 2000" (2008 Remixes)
2008 "Together"
2009 "Automatic City"
2008 "Together"
2012 "Letting You Go"
2012 "Deep Sea"
2014 "Summer Madness"
2015 "Back to Basic"
2015 "Icon"
2016 "Chakra"
2016 "Beneath the Stars"

Fate Federation
2003 "Mesmerize" / "Crime Scene"
2003 "Narcotics Guide" / "Mayhem"
2005 "Urbanoids" / "Kind Wishes"

Tangled Universe
2002 "Message from the Universe" / "Cosmic Synts"
2002 "Sparkling Message"
2003 "Next Victim" / "Blind Date"
2003 "Rain & Thunder" / "Execute Mode" / "Hyper Threading"
2005 "I Miss You" / "For a Reason"

Other aliases
1997 "Lovin'", as Love Foundation (with Marc van Dale)
1997 "Together", as Department 1
1997 "Trujacq/Good Food", as Positiv
1997 "Foreign Affair", as Force Full
1999 "Never Enough", as Love Foundation (with Marc van Dale)
2001 "Intensive Aqua", as Legal Traders

Albums
1999: 2000
2003: Melodies from the Universe

References

External links

Three Drives Website

Dutch trance music groups
Musical groups established in 1997